The 2015–16 Georgia Southern Eagles men's basketball team represented Georgia Southern University during the 2015–16 NCAA Division I men's basketball season. The Eagles, led by third year head coach Mark Byington, played their home games at Hanner Fieldhouse and were members of the Sun Belt Conference. They finished the season 14–17, 10–10 in Sun Belt play to finish in fifth place. They lost in the first round of the Sun Belt tournament to South Alabama.

Roster

Schedule

|-
!colspan=9 style="background:#000080; color:#FFFFFF;"| Exhibition

|-
!colspan=9 style="background:#000080; color:#FFFFFF;"| Regular season

|-
!colspan=9 style="background:#000080; color:#FFFFFF;"| Sun Belt tournament

References

Georgia Southern Eagles men's basketball seasons
Georgia Southern